

Headda (died c. 721) was a medieval Bishop of Lichfield.

Headda was consecrated in 691 and died between 716 and 727. He held the see of Leicester along with Lichfield. In 706 Headda consecrated the new church constructed at Crowland by Guthlac.

Prior to Headda's consecration, he had "almost certainly" been abbot of the monastery at Breedon, in Leicestershire, before which he may also have been a monk at Medeshamstede.

Notes

Citations

References

External links
 ; see also 

7th-century English bishops
8th-century English bishops
Bishops of Leicester
Anglo-Saxon bishops of Lichfield